Henry Middleton (born 18 March 1937) is an English former professional footballer who played in the Football League for Mansfield Town, Portsmouth, Scunthorpe United, Shrewsbury Town, Walsall and Wolverhampton Wanderers.

References

1937 births
Living people
English footballers
Association football forwards
English Football League players
Wolverhampton Wanderers F.C. players
Scunthorpe United F.C. players
Portsmouth F.C. players
Shrewsbury Town F.C. players
Mansfield Town F.C. players
Walsall F.C. players
Worcester City F.C. players
Tamworth F.C. players